Cyril Conrad Cowderoy (5 May 1905 - 10 October 1976) was a priest for over 45 years and a bishop for over 26 years in the Roman Catholic Church in England and Wales.

Born in Sidcup, Kent, on 5 May 1905, he was consecrated and ordained as parish priest in Southwark on 30 May 1931 by Cardinal Bernard William Griffin and Bishops Beck and Farren. On 12 December 1949 he was appointed Bishop of Southwark.

In 1964, he opened St. Michael and All Angels Catholic Church, in Locksbottom, Kent, inside of which is a commemorative plaque.

On 28 May 1965, aged 60, he was appointed as the first metropolitan Archbishop of Southwark by Pope Paul VI. He was Grand Prior for England and Wales of the Knights of the Order of the Holy Sepulchre of Jerusalem. Archbishop Cowderoy died in office on 10 October 1976, aged 71.

Consecrator
Archbishop Cowderoy consecrated or co-consecrated the following bishops (all deceased):

Bishop Bernard Patrick Wall
Bishop Charles Joseph Henderson
Bishop John Farmer Healy
Bishop David John Cashman
Bishop Langton Douglas Fox
Bishop Alan Clark

External links
http://www.catholic-hierarchy.org/bishop/bcowderoy.html
http://www.rcsouthwark.co.uk/permdiac.html

1905 births
1976 deaths
People from Sidcup
20th-century Roman Catholic archbishops in the United Kingdom
Participants in the Second Vatican Council
Members of the Order of the Holy Sepulchre
Roman Catholic archbishops of Southwark